Kristijan Đorđević (also transliterated Kristijan Djordjević; born 6 January 1976) is a Serbian former footballer.

Born in Spaichingen, West Germany, he made one appearance for FR Yugoslavia against Switzerland in a friendly on 2 September 1998.

References

External links
 
 
 

1976 births
Living people
People from Tuttlingen (district)
Sportspeople from Freiburg (region)
Serbian footballers
SSV Reutlingen 05 players
VfB Stuttgart players
VfB Stuttgart II players
FC Schalke 04 players
Association football midfielders
Serbia and Montenegro international footballers
Bundesliga players
German footballers
Serbia and Montenegro footballers
Footballers from Baden-Württemberg